Pirate Adventure Park is a small theme park located beside Westport House in Westport, Ireland. The Park is home to the first flume ride in Ireland (Pirates Plunge). The Park is Pirate themed due to Wesport House's association with Grace O'Malley. The Park was developed by The 11th Marquess  of Sligo on the grounds of Westport House.

Rides
 Pirates Plunge - Flume Ride
 The Pirate Ship
 Pirates Den (Indoor soft play area)
 Treasure Island Express

Other activities
 Pitch n'Putt
 The White Swan (pedal boats)
 Tennis

See also
 Westport House

External links
 Website

Amusement parks in Ireland
Tourist attractions in County Mayo
Buildings and structures in County Mayo